Earl Bumpus (April 14, 1914 - May 1985) was an American baseball pitcher in the Negro leagues. He played professionally from 1944 to 1948 with the Birmingham Black Barons, Kansas City Monarchs, and the Chicago American Giants.

References

External links
 and Baseball-Reference Black Baseball stats and Seamheads

1914 births
1985 deaths
Chicago American Giants players
Birmingham Black Barons players
Kansas City Monarchs players
Baseball players from Indiana
20th-century African-American sportspeople
Baseball pitchers